Kalateh-ye Khan (also Romanized as Kalāteh-ye Khān and Kalāteh Khān; also known as Kalāt Khān and Qalāteh-ye Khān) is a village in Dehmolla Rural District, in the Central District of Shahrud County, Semnan Province, Iran. At the 2006 census, its population was 160, in 24 families.

References 

Populated places in Shahrud County